Augusto Ramírez Ocampo (21 September 1934 – 14 June 2011) was a Colombian politician who served as Mayor of Bogotá from 1982 to 1984, and Colombia's foreign minister from 1984 to 1986. Ocampo died in Bogotá on 14 June 2011, aged 76.

References

1930s births
2011 deaths
Mayors of Bogotá
Colombian Conservative Party politicians
Foreign ministers of Colombia